Maud Petit is a French politician politician who has been serving as a member of the French National Assembly since 2017, representing  Val-de-Marne.

Early life
Born in Paris, Petit grew up in Martinique. She attended school in Fort-de-France, at the Convent Saint-Joseph de Cluny, at the College of Pointe des Nègres and Schœlcher High School, before leaving for Normandy pursue her graduate studies in Law and Modern Literature, at the University of Caen Normandy.

The daughter of an urban architect and a doctor in geography, elder sister of 5 siblings, she is also granddaughter of Camille Petit, doctor became deputy of Martinique from 1967 to 1986. She is the mother of two children.
She does her professional career in the field of Human Resources.

Political career

Career in local politics
Petit was elected municipal councilor of Villiers-sur-Marne in the 2014 municipal elections on the UMP-UDI-MoDem union list led by Jacques-Alain Bénisti. She then in charge of the delegation of early childhood.

Member of the National Assembly
Petit was elected to the French National Assembly on 18 June 2017, representing the 4th constituency of Val-de-Marne.

In the National Assembly, Petit sits on the Cultural and Education Affairs Committee. She is a member of 
the Working Group on the Olympic and Paralympic Games in Paris in 2024 and member of the Mission of information on the school in the digital society. She is a Secretary of the Delegation to overseas.

In addition to her committee assignments, Petit has been a member of the French delegation to the Parliamentary Assembly of the Council of Europe since 2022. In this capacity, she has been serving on the Committee on Equality and Non-Discrimination.

See also
 2017 French legislative election
 Val-de-Marne's 4th constituency

References

1971 births
Living people
French people of Martiniquais descent
Black French politicians
Deputies of the 15th National Assembly of the French Fifth Republic
Women members of the National Assembly (France)
Democratic Movement (France) politicians
21st-century French women politicians
University of Caen Normandy alumni
Deputies of the 16th National Assembly of the French Fifth Republic